The Paratrooper Company was the paratroop branch of the Aeronautical Corps of Peru. Formed in 1939, it saw combat during the Ecuadorian–Peruvian War, when it seized the Ecuadorian port city of Puerto Bolívar on 27 July 1941, marking the first time in the Americas that airborne troops were used in combat.

History
On 27 March 1927, Enrique Tavernie Entelador became the first Peruvian paratrooper when he leapt from an Avro aircraft, piloted by Captain Clifford, from a height of 2,000 meters over Las Palmas Air Base (then Las Palmas Aerodrome). Subsequently, on 10 May 1928, Second Lieutenant César Álvarez Guerra voluntarily jumped from a height of 3,000 meters, becoming the first military paratrooper. Major Fernando Melgar Conde and Sergeant 1st. Jose Pineda Castro followed on 16 May 1928, when they jumped over Las Palmas at altitudes of 2,000 and 4,300 meters, respectively. On 24 May of that year, Ensign Peter Griva, of the seaplane service from Ancon, jumped from a height of 2,000 meters.

The first Parachute School opened in 1939, with now Colonel Guerra in command. José Quiñones attended this school.

On 14 November 1940, Sgt. Lazaro Orrego became the first casualty of the unit when his parachute failed to open while doing exercises in Ancón.

Ecuadorian–Peruvian War

The unit became well known during the Ecuadorian–Peruvian War when paratroopers Antonio Brandariz Ulloa, Carlos Raffo García and Armando Orozco seized the city of Puerto Bolívar in southern Ecuador prior to the declaration of a ceasefire on July 31, 1941, concluding the Peruvian offensive in El Oro Province.

See also
 History of Paratrooping
 Sinchis, a similar unit of the National Police of Peru, formerly the Civil Guard.

Notes

References

Airborne warfare
Special forces of Peru